Pepin I or Pepin I of Aquitaine (French: Pépin; 797 – 13 December 838) was King of Aquitaine and Duke of Maine.

Pepin was the second son of Emperor Louis the Pious and his first wife, Ermengarde of Hesbaye. When his father assigned to each of his sons a kingdom (within the Empire) in August 817, he received Aquitaine, which had been Louis's own subkingdom during his father Charlemagne's reign. Ermoldus Nigellus was his court poet and accompanied him on a campaign into Brittany in 824.

Rebellions 
Pepin rebelled in 830 at the insistence of his brother Lothair's advisor Wala.  He took an army of Gascons with him and marched all the way to Paris, with the support of the Neustrians.  His father marched back from a campaign in Brittany all the way to Compiègne, where Pepin surrounded his forces and captured him.  The rebellion, however, broke up.

In 832, Pepin rebelled again and his brother Louis the German soon followed. Louis the Pious was in Aquitaine to subdue any revolt, but was drawn off by the Bavarian insurrection of the younger Louis. Pepin took Limoges and other Imperial territories.  The next year, Lothair joined the rebellion and, with the assistance of Ebbo, archbishop of Reims, the rebel sons deposed their father in 833.  Lothair's later behaviour alienated Pepin, and the latter was at his father's side when Louis the Pious was reinstated on 1 March 834. Pepin was restored to his former status.

Death 
Pepin died scarcely four years after getting restored to his former status, he was buried in the Church of St. Radegonde in Poitiers.

Marriage and issue 
In 822, Pepin had married Ingeltrude, daughter of Theodobert, count of Madrie, with whom he had two sons: Pepin II (823-after 864), and Charles (825-830 - 4 June 863), who became Archbishop of Mainz.

Both were minors when Pepin died, so Louis the Pious awarded Aquitaine to his own youngest son, Pepin's half-brother Charles the Bald. The Aquitainians, however, elected Pepin's son as Pepin II. His brother Charles also briefly claimed the kingdom. Both died childless. Pepin also had two daughters, one of whom married Gerard, Count of Auvergne.

Notes

Sources
Collins, Roger. "Pippin I and the Kingdom of Aquitaine." Charlemagne's Heir: New Perspectives on the Reign of Louis the Pious, edd. P. Godman and Roger Collins. Oxford: Oxford University Press, 1990.  Reprinted in Law, Culture and Regionalism in Early Medieval Spain. Variorum, 1992. .

Monarchs of the Carolingian Empire
Dukes of Maine
Frankish warriors
797 births
838 deaths
9th-century Frankish monarchs
Burials in Nouvelle-Aquitaine
Rebellious princes
Sons of emperors